Arnaldo Carli (30 July 1901 – 14 September 1972) was an Italian racing cyclist and Olympic champion in track cycling. He was born in Milan.

Carli won a gold medal in team pursuit at the 1920 Summer Olympics in Antwerp (with Ruggero Ferrario, Franco Giorgetti and Primo Magnani).

References

External links
 
 
 
 
 

1901 births
1972 deaths
Italian male cyclists
Italian track cyclists
Olympic cyclists of Italy
Olympic gold medalists for Italy
Olympic medalists in cycling
Cyclists at the 1920 Summer Olympics
Medalists at the 1920 Summer Olympics
Cyclists from Milan